See also Dunbar (disambiguation)

Dunbar is a city in Kanawha County, West Virginia, United States, situated along the Kanawha River. The population was 7,479 at the 2020 census.

History

Dunbar was incorporated on April 19, 1921, by an Act of the West Virginia Legislature. Dunbar is on land that was originally occupied by Native Americans with 11 mounds identified in the residential areas. The land was granted to George Washington for his military service and was named for Mary Dunbar after she inherited the land from Washington, although other sources say it was named for Dunbar Baines, a prominent area banker.

Dunbar was a farming community until industries began to evolve in the city with the opening of glass and bottling plants in 1912. The Gravely Plow was invented in Dunbar in 1916.

Located at Dunbar is the Dutch Hollow Wine Cellars, listed on the National Register of Historic Places in 1970. The park is listed on the Register due to the walk-in wine cellars located within the Park. In the past the area was known for its vineyards and the cellars were used to store wine made from the grapes grown in the vineyards. The cellars were thought to be built around 1860 due to the popularity of wine-making. The wine was then hauled to Charleston and Cincinnati. After the Civil War, wine making was no longer profitable and the vineyards were abandoned. The popularity of wine in neighboring Virginia and Ohio also had an impact on grape growing in West Virginia. The wine cellars are preserved and protected for future generations due to the foresight of Dunbar to develop the area into a City park.

Geography
Dunbar is located at  (38.364319, -81.739539). Dunbar is served by Interstate 64 and WV 25.

Notable businesses
In the past, Dunbar was home to a glass industry, through the Dunbar Glass and Kanawha Glass companies.  Dunbar was also home to the Gravely Tractor company.

Demographics

2010 census
As of the census of 2010, there were 7,907 people, 3,795 households, and 2,000 families living in the city. The racial makeup of the city was 82.7% White, 12.2% African American, 0.2% Native American, 1.7% Asian, 0.4% from other races, and 2.7% from two or more races. Hispanic or Latino of any race were 1.0% of the population.

There were 3,795 households, of which 23.2% had children under the age of 18 living with them, 33.8% were married couples living together, 14.8% had a female householder with no husband present, 4.1% had a male householder with no wife present, and 47.3% were non-families. 40.7% of all households were made up of individuals, and 16.2% had someone living alone who was 65 years of age or older. The average household size was 2.05 and the average family size was 2.75.

The median age in the city was 43.2 years. 18.4% of residents were under the age of 18; 7.8% were between the ages of 18 and 24; 25.9% were from 25 to 44; 27.8% were from 45 to 64; and 20.1% were 65 years of age or older. The gender makeup of the city was 45.7% male and 54.3% female.

2000 census
As of the census of 2000, there were 8,154 people, 3,744 households, and 2,167 families living in the city. The population density was 2,874.5 people per square mile (1,108.5/km2). There were 4,128 housing units at an average density of 1,455.2 per square mile (561.2/km2). The racial makeup of the city was 85.65% White, 10.72% African American, 0.09% Native American, 1.80% Asian, 0.01% Pacific Islander, 0.18% from other races, and 1.55% from two or more races. Hispanic or Latino of any race were 0.55% of the population.

There were 3,744 households, out of which 21.8% had children under the age of 18 living with them, 41.5% were married couples living together, 13.5% had a female householder with no husband present, and 42.1% were non-families. 37.8% of all households were made up of individuals, and 15.4% had someone living alone who was 65 years of age or older. The average household size was 2.07 and the average family size was 2.72.

In the city, the population was spread out, with 18.1% under the age of 18, 10.3% from 18 to 24, 27.2% from 25 to 44, 23.2% from 45 to 64, and 21.3% who were 65 years of age or older. The median age was 41 years. For every 100 females, there were 82.8 males. For every 100 females age 18 and over, there were 77.0 males.

The median income for a household in the city was $35,117, and the median income for a family was $42,665. Males had a median income of $34,816 versus $24,184 for females. The per capita income for the city was $19,030. About 13.2% of families and 15.3% of the population were below the poverty line, including 26.5% of those under age 18 and 10.1% of those age 65 or over.

Education
Dunbar is served by the following schools:
 Dunbar Primary School (K–2)
 Dunbar Intermediate Center (3–5)
 Dunbar Middle School (6–8)
 South Charleston High School (9–12) — There is no public high school in Dunbar. Students attend South Charleston High School.
 Ben Franklin Career Center

References

External links
 City of Dunbar, WV

Cities in West Virginia
Cities in Kanawha County, West Virginia
Populated places on the Kanawha River
Charleston, West Virginia metropolitan area